Tadibya (tádyebya) is the mediator between the ordinary world and the upper- and underworlds of the spirits among the Nenets people. The Nenets rank their shamans by their spiritual attachment and function as well as their experience.

Categories
The following categories of Nenets shamans are listed by Mihaly Hoppal, who cites research conducted by L. Khomitch and Leonid A. Lar. 
 Vidutana, strong shamans standing in contact with the upper world
 Yanyani tadebya, shamans belonging to the earth
 Sambana shamans, shamans able to receive messages from dead people and to perform other rituals concerning the dead.

References

External links
  The Process of Education of the Nenets Shamans, by Leonid A. Lar
  The Nenets Shamans, by Leonid A. Lar
 Jarkko Niemi: The types of the Nenets songs. 1997
 The shamanistic songs
 Sámbadabts

Nenets people
Religious occupations
Siberian shamanism